Contemporary is the historical period that is immediately relevant to the present and is a certain perspective of modern history.

Contemporary may also refer to:
Contemporary philosophy
Contemporary art, post-World War II art 
Contemporary dance, a modern genre of concert dance 
Contemporary literature, post-World War II literature 
Contemporary music, post-World War II music 
Contemporary (magazine), an art magazine
Contemporary Records, a jazz record label

See also 
 
 Contemporary classical music, post-World War II classical music
 Contemporary Christian music, modern Christian faith music 
 Contemporary R&B, modern rhythm and blues
 Urban contemporary, music radio format
 Contemporary hit radio, Top 40 radio format
 Adult contemporary music, adult music radio format
 Disney's Contemporary Resort, resort hotel located at the Walt Disney World Resort, opened in 1971